Paweł Marek Dawidowicz (born 20 May 1995) is a Polish professional footballer who plays for Italian club Hellas Verona and the Poland national team as a defender. Besides Poland, he has played in Portugal, Germany, and Italy.

Club career
Dawidowicz played for Lechia Gdańsk senior team for two years. On 20 May 2014, he signed a five-year-contract for Portuguese champions Benfica, being assigned to the reserve team. On 15 March 2015, Dawidowicz scored his first goal for Benfica B in a 3–0 away win at Farense in Segunda Liga.

On 20 March 2019, Dawidowicz signed a permanent deal with Italian side Verona after joining the club on loan for the 2018–19 season. Prior to that, from 2016 to 2018, he had been loaned out to VfL Bochum in Germany and Palermo in Italy for one season each.

International career
Dawidowicz made his senior international debut for Poland as a substitute in a 3–1 friendly win against the Czech Republic in Wrocław on 17 November 2015, replacing Michał Pazdan for the final minutes.

Dawidowicz was named in Poland's preliminary 35-man squad for the 2018 World Cup in Russia. However, he did not make the final 23.

Career statistics

Club

International

References

External links

 
 
 

1995 births
Living people
Sportspeople from Olsztyn
Polish footballers
Association football defenders
Association football midfielders
Lechia Gdańsk players
S.L. Benfica B players
VfL Bochum players
Palermo F.C. players
Hellas Verona F.C. players
Ekstraklasa players
Liga Portugal 2 players
2. Bundesliga players
Serie A players
Serie B players
Expatriate footballers in Portugal
Polish expatriate sportspeople in Portugal
Expatriate footballers in Germany
Polish expatriate sportspeople in Germany
Expatriate footballers in Italy
Polish expatriate sportspeople in Italy
Poland youth international footballers
Poland under-21 international footballers
Poland international footballers
UEFA Euro 2020 players